The Generali-class destroyer was a class of Italian destroyers, built as a development of the . They were the last ships of the Regia Marina (Italian Navy), fitted with three stacks. In 1929, being obsolete, the units were reclassified as torpedo boats, and in this role served during Second World War.

Origins
The class was built between 1921 and 1924, ordered from Cantieri navali Odero, Sestri Ponente. The ships were able to reach  of top speed, an improvement respect the previous class Rosolino Pilo. Their displacement was 832 tons (normal) and 890 tons (full load). Their armament initially was composed of three /45 calibre guns (an Italian version of the QF 4 inch Mk V) and two  L30 guns, and four  torpedo launchers. In 1936 ships were enabled with minesweeping equipment, and the 76 mm guns were replaced by twin cannons Breda Model 35.

Units
The class was known also by name of his first unit, Generale Antonio Cantore. All other ships were dedicated to Italian generals. All ships were built by Cantieri navali Odero at Sestri Ponente. None of them survived the war.

References

Bibliography

External links
 Classe Generali Marina Militare website

 
Destroyers of Italy
Destroyer classes